Horia debyi, is a species of blister beetle found in Sri Lanka, Singapore, Brunei and Malaysia.

Description
Body length is about 25.1 to 26.3 mm. Head with very small, sparse punctures and fine, dense pubescence. Eyes are large and protuberant. Pronotum with fine dense punctures with fine sparse pubescence. Elytra densely covered with large punctures and fine pubescence. Legs consists with strongly compressed tarsi. Ventrum densely covered with moderately long pubescence. Male has shallowly emarginate fifth visible abdominal sternum, and shallowly emeginate pygidium. Female has reddish black abdominal sternum and emarginate visible abdominal sternum.

References 

Meloidae
Insects of Sri Lanka
Beetles described in 1885